Union Carbide Corporation is an American chemical corporation wholly owned subsidiary (since February 6, 2001) by Dow Chemical Company. Union Carbide produces chemicals and polymers that undergo one or more further conversions by customers before reaching consumers. Some are high-volume commodities and others are specialty products meeting the needs of smaller markets. Markets served include paints and coatings, packaging, wire and cable, household products, personal care, pharmaceuticals, automotive, textiles, agriculture, and oil and gas. The company is a former component of the Dow Jones Industrial Average.

Founded in 1917 as the Union Carbide and Carbon Corporation, from a merger with National Carbon Company, the company's researchers developed an economical way to make ethylene from natural gas liquids, such as ethane and propane, giving birth to the modern petrochemical industry. The company divested consumer products businesses Eveready and Energizer batteries, Glad bags and wraps, Simoniz car wax and Prestone antifreeze. The company divested other businesses before being acquired by Dow including electronic chemicals, polyurethane intermediates, industrial gases (Linde) and carbon products.

History
The Union Carbide and Carbon Corporation was formed on November 1, 1917, from the merger of the Union Carbide Company founded in 1898, the National Carbon Company founded in 1886, Linde Air Products Company, a maker of liquid oxygen at Buffalo confiscated from Gesellschaft für Linde's Eismaschinen AG under the Trading with the Enemy Act of 1917, and the Prest-O-Lite company, manufacturer of calcium carbide in Indianapolis. In 1920, the company set up a chemicals division which manufactured ethylene glycol for use as automotive antifreeze. The company continued to acquire related chemical producers, including the Bakelite Corporation in 1939. The company changed its name to "Union Carbide Corporation" in 1957 and was often referred to as Carbide. It operated Oak Ridge National Laboratory from 1947 to 1984.

During the Cold war era, the company was active in the field of rocket propulsion research & development for aerospace and guided missile applications, particularly in the field of chemicals and plastics, solid rocket motors, and storable liquid fuels. R&D was conducted at the Technical Center in South Charleston, West Virginia. The Aerospace Materials Department was part of the company's Carbon Products Division.

Ucar batteries was Carbide's industrial and consumer zinc chloride battery business. The business, including Energizer alkaline batteries, was sold to Ralston Purina in 1986, following a hostile takeover attempt.

After the Bhopal disaster, Union Carbide was the subject of repeated takeover attempts. In order to pay off its debt, Carbide sold many of its most familiar brands such as Glad Trashbags and Eveready Batteries. Dow Chemical announced the purchase of Carbide in 1999 for $8.89 billion in stock. The deal was consummated in 2001 and valued at $11.6 billion.

Hawks Nest Tunnel disaster

The Hawks Nest Tunnel disaster took place between 1927 and 1932 in a West Virginia tunnel project led by Union Carbide. During the construction of the tunnel, workers found the mineral silica and were asked to mine it for use in electroprocessing steel. The workers were not given masks or breathing equipment to use while mining. Due to silica dust exposure, many workers developed silicosis, a debilitating lung disease. According to a marker on site, there were 109 admitted deaths. A congressional hearing placed the death toll at 476.

Asbestos mining and 'Calidria' brand fibers
In the early 1960s, Union Carbide Corporation began mining a newly identified outcrop of chrysotile asbestos fibers near King City and New Idria, California. These fibers were sold under the brand name "Calidria", a combination of "Cal" and "Idria", and sold in large quantities for a wide variety of purposes, including addition into joint compound or drywall accessory products.  Union Carbide sold the mine to its employees under the name KCAC ("King City Asbestos Mine") in the 1980s, but it only operated for a few more years.

1984 Bhopal Disaster

Union Carbide India Limited, owned by Union Carbide (50.9%) and Indian investors (49.1%), operated a pesticide plant in the Indian city of Bhopal. Around midnight on 3 December 1984, methyl isocyanate (MIC) gas was accidentally released from the plant, exposing more than 500,000 people to MIC and other chemicals. The main reason was the poorly managed safety measures, which were either malfunctioning or not working, and weren't repaired in order to cut costs. The government of Madhya Pradesh confirmed a total of 16,000 deaths related to the gas release. It left an estimated 40,000 individuals permanently disabled, maimed, or suffering from serious illness, making it one of the world's worst industrial disasters.
In 1982, Carbide's auditors warned of a possible 'runaway reaction'. Carbide insisted the accident was an act of sabotage by a rogue worker.  Union Carbide was sued by the Government of India and agreed to an out-of-court settlement of US$470 million in 1989. The plant site has not yet been cleaned up.

Warren Anderson, CEO at the time of the disaster, refused to answer to homicide charges and remained a fugitive from India's courts. The U.S. denied several extradition requests. Anderson died on 29 September 2014 in Florida. Seven UCC employees were convicted of criminal negligence in 2010 and fined $2,000 each.

1985 West Virginia gas leak
The year after the Bhopal disaster, a faulty valve at the UC plant in Institute, West Virginia caused a large cloud of gas that injured six employees and caused almost 200 nearby residents to seek medical treatment for respiratory and skin irritation. Union Carbide blamed the leak of aldicarb oxime (made from MIC but does not contain any MIC itself), the main ingredient in the popular farm pesticide Temik, on a valve failure after a buildup of pressure in a storage tank containing 500 pounds of the chemical. A company spokesman insisted that the aldicarb oxime leak “never was a threat to the community.”

Union Carbide in Australia
Union Carbide's operations in Australia commenced in 1957, when it purchased the plant of the Australian-owned company Timbrol Ltd. The Timbrol factory was on the shore of Homebush Bay in the Sydney suburb of Rhodes. Homebush Bay is on the Parramatta River which flows into Sydney Harbour. Tibrol produced phenol, the insecticides chlorobenzene/chlorophenol/DDT, and the herbicides 2,4-D and 2,4,5-T. Union Carbide continued the production of the 2,4-D and 2,4,5-T until 1976 and chlorobenzene/chlorophenol/DDT until 1983.  Union Carbide also commenced the production of bisphenol A in 1960 and phenol formaldehyde resins in 1964.

Union Carbide reclaimed land on neighboring properties by depositing spent lime and ash into the adjacent marshes in Homebush Bay.  This practice, which had been approved by the Maritime Services Board, ceased in 1970.

Union Carbide ceased operations in Australia in 1985. In 1987, the New South Wales Pollution Control Commission ordered Union Carbide to remediate the site. This work, which cost Union Carbide $30 million, was conducted between 1988 and 1993. The work involved excavation and encapsulation of the contaminated soil.

In 2004, the New South Wales Minister for Planning granted consent for additional remediation of the former Union Carbide site to proceed, including parts of Homebush Bay.  Approximately 900,000 tons of soil were excavated from the site, 190,000 tons of soil from the adjacent Allied Feeds site, and approximately 50,000 tons of sediment from the bay.  Remediation of the Allied Feeds Site was completed in August 2009, Homebush Bay sediments in August 2010, and the Union Carbide site in March 2011. The cost of the remediation work was $35M for the Allied Feeds site, and  $100 million for Union Carbide site and Homebush Bay sediments.

Demolition of former New York headquarters building

The former Union Carbide headquarters building, at 270 Park Avenue in New York City, was a 52-story modernist office building designed by architectural firm Skidmore, Owings & Merrill and completed in 1961. The company relocated its headquarters to Danbury, Connecticut in 1982, to a newly-built complex known as the Union Carbide Corporate Center. 270 Park Avenue later became the headquarters of JPMorgan Chase. In February 2018 it was announced that the building would be demolished and replaced with a new  tower serving as the consolidated headquarters for JPMorgan Chase.

See also 

BASF
National Carbon Company
Carbide & Carbon Building
Union Carbide Corporate Center

References

External links
 
 Television Commercial
 CSIR Bhopal Disaster Report (1985)

1898 establishments in Texas
2001 mergers and acquisitions
American companies established in 1898
Chemical companies established in 1898
Chemical companies of Australia
Chemical companies of the United States
Companies based in Houston
Dow Chemical Company
Former components of the Dow Jones Industrial Average
Multinational companies headquartered in the United States
Non-renewable resource companies established in 1898
Petrochemical companies of India
Petrochemical companies